The 1954 United States Senate election in Louisiana was held on November 2, 1954. Incumbent Senator Allen J. Ellender was re-elected to a fourth term in office.

On July 27, Ellender won the Democratic primary with 59.15% of the vote. At this time, Louisiana was a one-party state, and the Democratic nomination was tantamount to victory. Ellender won the November general election without an opponent.

Democratic primary

Candidates
Allen J. Ellender, incumbent Senator
Frank B. Ellis, member of the Democratic National Committee
W. Gilbert Faulk, State Representative from Monroe

Results

General election

References

1954
Louisiana
United States Senate
Single-candidate elections